KMHT (1450 AM, 96.9 FM) is a terrestrial AM radio station, paired with an FM relay translator, broadcasting a sports format.

KMHT-FM (103.9 FM) is a terrestrial FM radio station broadcasting a classic country format. Both facilities, as well as the translator, are licensed to Marshall in Harrison County, Texas, United States, and serve the Longview-Marshall area.  The stations are currently owned by Hanszen Broadcast Group, Inc.

The stations also broadcasts Marshall High School athletics as well as TSN (Texas State Network), Texas Rangers, Houston Astros, Dallas Cowboys, Houston Texans, Dallas Mavericks, the University of Texas Longhorn Athletics, and Texas A&M athletics.  Other area high school athletics that KMHT covers include Harleton, Elysian Fields, and Waskom.

History
A group of local veterans returned to Marshall from World War II and took advantage of their right to first preferences of frequencies after the radio frequency freeze was lifted at the end of the war.  In 1961, after 14 years of operation, KMHT AM was granted FCC permission to raise the daytime power from 250 watts to 1,000 watts. Shortly thereafter, the FCC approved the operation of 1000 Watts around the clock. A later move to a new transmitter site required lowering the power to 650 watts.

In the late 1990s, KMHT was given to Wiley College, a historically black four-year liberal arts institution affiliated with the United Methodist Church, by then owner professional boxer George Foreman.

Wiley College later sold the stations to Jerry Russell, a former member of the Tyler City Council. Russell wanted to use KMHT-FM as a repeater for his AM station, 690 KZEY (which has since gone silent), so KMHT-FM became KZEY-FM.

In August 2002, Hanszen Broadcast Group, Inc., purchased KMHT/KZEY and changed the FM back to KMHT-FM. In the fall of 2006, KMHT 1450 AM changed the format to ESPN Radio.  The format includes local sports coverage as well as the network coverage.  The KMHT-FM format stayed the same.

Translator

References

External links

MHT
Radio stations established in 1961